EastEnders is a British soap opera that has aired on BBC One since 19 February 1985. It has been nominated for a variety of different awards including 21 British Academy Television Awards (ten wins), 13 Royal Television Society Programme Awards (four wins), 27 Television and Radio Industries Club (TRIC) Awards (17 wins) and 332 British Soap Awards (84 wins). Its first award, for Favourite Programme, was given by the Anna Scher Theatre on 24 January 1986.

At the British Academy Television Awards, EastEnders has won the Best Soap or Best Continuing Drama Award ten times, in 1997, 1999, 2000, 2002, 2006, 2010, 2011, 2013, 2016 and 2019, with a further eight nominations (2001, 2003, 2007, 2008, 2009, 2012, 2014 and 2015), and Best Drama Series once, in 1997. The show has received 21 nominations in the Most Popular Serial Drama category at the National Television Awards, which it has won 12 times. It has also won Best Soap at the Royal Television Society Programme Awards four times, in 2002, 2009, 2010 and 2011, with further nominations in 2004, 2005, 2006, 2012, 2013, 2014, 2015, 2016 and 2017.

At The British Soap Awards, it has won Best British Soap 11 times, Best Storyline four times and Best Single Episode three times. In 2013, Adam Woodyatt won a lifetime achievement award for his portrayal of Ian Beale. The show has won Inside Soap Best Soap Award every year from 1996 to 2006, from 2008 to 2012, and in 2014. In the TV Choice awards, it won Best Soap in 1999, from 2001 to 2003, in 2006, from 2008 to 2012, in 2014 and 2015.

In March 2009, EastEnders won its third TRIC award in the category TV Soap of the Year, having also won similar categories at the British Soap Awards, National Television Awards, TV Choice Awards, and Inside Soap Awards within 10 months. EastEnders Executive Producer Diederick Santer commented that this was due to having "the most talented cast and crew in the business, and the most fantastic and dedicated audience."

Several different EastEnders actors have received acting award nominations for their performances in the show. June Brown is the only EastEnders actor to receive a nomination at the British Academy Television Awards and Patsy Palmer is the only one to be nominated in the Royal Television Society Programme Awards. Simon May won a TRIC award in 1986 for the EastEnders theme tune. Co-creator Tony Holland and writer Tony Jordan have also been honoured.

British Academy Television Awards
The British Academy Television Awards are awarded annually by the British Academy of Film and Television Arts (BAFTA). EastEnders has received 21 British Academy Television Awards nominations and has won ten of them. It won the award for Best Drama Series in 1997 and has been nominated for Best Continuing Drama or Best Soap 21 times, winning in 1997,1999, 2000, 2002, 2006, 2010, 2011, 2013, 2016 and 2019. June Brown was nominated in 2009 for Best Actress, the first time a soap opera actress was nominated in this category since Jean Alexander who played Hilda Ogden in Coronation Street in 1988. She was the favourite to win the award, but lost out to Anna Maxwell Martin.

National Television Awards
The National Television Awards were first awarded in 1995. The show has received a total of 25 nominations in the Serial Drama category, which it has won 12 times. The most awarded EastEnders actor at the National Television Awards is Lacey Turner, with a total of eight nominations and four wins.

Royal Television Society Programme Awards
The Royal Television Society Programme Awards ceremony takes place every March in central London. EastEnders has been nominated in the Soap category (Soap and Continual Drama from 2007 onwards) 11 times, and has won four times, in 2002, 2009, 2010 and 2011. In 2009, episodes were submitted to a panel from "Whitney Week", a week of episodes centred around the character of Whitney Dean, played by Shona McGarty. In 2011, Lindsay Coulson's portrayal of Carol Jackson was praised by the judges, following the death of her son Billie Jackson (Devon Anderson). Actress Patsy Palmer was also nominated in the Actor Female category in 1998 for her portrayal of Bianca Jackson.

Television and Radio Industries Club Awards
The Television and Radio Industries Club (TRIC) Awards were established in 1969. They are awarded annually and are voted for by members of the television and radio industry. EastEnders has won a total of 12 awards, including Best TV Theme Music in 1987 (awarded to Simon May), TV Soap Personality in 2007, 2011 and 2013 (awarded to Lacey Turner, Jessie Wallace and Shane Richie respectively), New TV Talent in 2004 (Christopher Parker), five awards for TV Soap of the Year, in 2002, 2008, 2009, 2010 and 2012, and the TRIC Special Award in 2010, presented to Barbara Windsor for her 15 years playing the character Peggy Mitchell.

The British Soap Awards
The British Soap Awards began in 1999 and EastEnders has since won the award for Best British Soap 11 times. Three categories (Best British Soap, Best Actor and Best Actress) are voted for by the public, the rest of which are decided by a panel. Adam Woodyatt won a lifetime achievement award in 2013 for his portrayal of Ian Beale since 1985. In 2018, an award was given jointly for the first time, as the "Scene of the Year" award received equal numbers of votes for EastEnders and Doctors.

Inside Soap Awards
The Inside Soap Awards are voted for by readers of Inside Soap magazine.  EastEnders won the Best British Soap award ten years running, from 1997 to 2006. It lost out in 2007 to Coronation Street but won the award again every year from 2008 to 2012. Lacey Turner has won the Best Actress award for her role as Stacey Slater four times.

TV Choice Awards
The TV Choice Awards, awarded by TV Choice magazine, began in 1997 as the TV Quick Awards. Between 2005 and 2009 they were known as the TV Quick and TV Choice Awards. They are voted for by readers of the magazine.

Digital Spy Awards
Entertainment website Digital Spy hosted the Digital Spy Soap Awards in 2008, where EastEnders won seven of the 14 categories. From 2014, Digital Spy held the Digital Spy Reader Awards. In 2014, EastEnders won all five awards in the soaps category.

All About Soap Awards
The All About Soap Awards (formerly The All About Soap Bubble Awards) are presented by All About Soap magazine and voted for by the public. They started in 2002.

TV Now Awards
The TV Now Awards are awarded annually by Irish magazine TV Now. In 2007, actor Steve McFadden won in the Male Soap Star category and Lacey Turner won the Hot Young Talent award. In 2009, Barbara Windsor won the Soap Legend Award for her portrayal of Peggy Mitchell.

TV Times Awards
In the TV Times Awards, which began in 1969 and are awarded by TV Times magazine, actress Lacey Turner won Favourite Soap Star in 2008 and 2009 and EastEnders received a further three nominations in 2009 including Favourite Soap Star for Barbara Windsor. Turner won and Windsor was nominated again in 2010.

Other awards
In 1985, Simon May was nominated for an Ivor Novello Award for Best TV Theme of the Year, for the EastEnders theme tune. It failed to win, but in 1986 the song "Every Loser Wins", which was written by May for a storyline in the show involving the character of Simon Wicks (Nick Berry) and his band The Banned, won the Ivor Novello Award for Best Selling Single.

EastEnders has won four Mental Health Media Awards in the category 'Soaps and Continual Dramas' for its portrayal of mental health issues. EastEnders was given an award in 1997 for the storyline of Joe Wicks (Paul Nicholls) developing schizophrenia. Jessie Wallace received the 2002 award for her portrayal of Kat Slater, a woman who had been raped by her uncle as a teenager and attempted suicide when he returned later in her life. The award was won again in 2006 for the storyline involving Stacey Slater and her mentally ill mother Jean. The show was nominated again in 2009 but lost to Pobol y Cwm, however, it won the 'Making a Difference' award. In 2010, EastEnders won in the 'soaps' category again for the storyline involving Stacey Slater. EastEnders has also won the "Doing Media Differently" in 2009 from the Royal Association for Disability Rights, for the number of characters portrayed with disabilities and illnesses.

In 2006, EastEnders received a prestigious Rose d'Or at the international television awards ceremony in Lucerne, Switzerland for its continuing success over 21 years. Actor Shane Richie also won a Rose d'Or in 2004 for best performance in a soap. In 2006, Wendy Richard (Pauline Fowler) was named Most Popular TV Personality at the Variety Club Awards. The award was voted for by readers of the Daily Express newspaper. And the entire cast and crew won the Variety Club BBC Personality of the Year in 1997. In February 2009, actress Tiana Benjamin, who plays Chelsea Fox, was voted Favourite Female TV Star at the Screen Nation Awards, which celebrate international achievement within black world cinema and television, by the public. She was nominated for Best UK Actress at the 2009 Black International Film Festival and Music Video & Screen Awards, and Rudolph Walker, who plays Patrick Trueman, received the Lifetime Achievement Award. At the same ceremony, EastEnders was nominated for Best UK Drama with a Black Cast. In 2011, EastEnders stars received five Screen Nation nominations, two others—Ellen Thomas (Grace Olubunmi) and Sharon Duncan-Brewster (Trina Johnson)—received special mentions, and EastEnders itself received one nomination. In 2012, EastEnders and EastEnders: E20 stars received four nominations, with actress Modupe Adeyeye receiving a special mention.

In the Daily Star Soaper Star Awards, launched in 2008 and voted for by readers of the newspaper, EastEnders won the first Best Soap award as well as awards for Best Actor and Best Newcomer. EastEnders has also won a Banff World Television Festival Award, a Smash Hits T4 Pollwinners' Party award, two Pye Awards, an Anna Scher Theatre Award and an SOS Star Award.

Diversity and health-related awards

Others

References

Awards and nominations
EastEnders